Erik Alexander Expósito Hernández (born 23 June 1996) is a Spanish professional footballer who plays for Polish club Śląsk Wrocław as a forward.

Club career
Born in Santa Cruz de Tenerife, Canary Islands, Expósito joined Málaga CF's youth setup in January 2015, after stints at AJ Unión La Paz, CD Verdellada, CD Paracuellos, Atlético Barranco Hondo and ADM Lorquí. He made his debut with the reserves on 27 September of that year, coming on as a substitute for goalscorer Kuki Zalazar in a 5–0 Tercera División home routing of Atarfe Industrial CF.

On 2 January 2016, he was loaned to fellow fourth tier club Deportivo Rayo Cantabria, until June. After appearing regularly he moved to another reserve team, UD Las Palmas Atlético in the same division on 18 July.

On 26 April 2017, Expósito made his first team – and La Liga – debut, starting in a 3–0 away loss against CD Leganés. On 16 June, he was promoted to the main squad ahead of the 2017–18 campaign.

Expósito scored his first professional goal on 5 March 2018, netting the opener in a 2–1 loss at Celta de Vigo. He contributed with ten first-team appearances during the campaign, as his side suffered relegation.

On 31 August 2018, Expósito was loaned to Segunda División side Córdoba CF, for one year. The following 25 January, after being rarely used, his loan was cut short.

Expósito moved abroad on 27 June 2019, signing a three-year deal with Polish Ekstraklasa club Śląsk Wrocław after his Las Palmas contract expired. On 21 September, he scored a hat-trick in a 4–4 home draw against local rivals Zagłębie Lubin.

Career statistics

References

External links

1996 births
Living people
Spanish footballers
Footballers from Santa Cruz de Tenerife
Association football forwards
La Liga players
Segunda División players
Segunda División B players
Tercera División players
Ekstraklasa players
Atlético Malagueño players
Deportivo Rayo Cantabria players
UD Las Palmas Atlético players
UD Las Palmas players
Córdoba CF players
Śląsk Wrocław players
Spanish expatriate footballers
Spanish expatriate sportspeople in Poland
Expatriate footballers in Poland